Grayenulla is a genus of Australian jumping spiders that was first described by Marek Michał Żabka in 1992.

Species
 it contains seven species, found only in Queensland, New South Wales, and Western Australia:
Grayenulla australensis Zabka, 1992 – Australia (Western Australia)
Grayenulla dejongi Zabka, 1992 (type) – Australia (Western Australia)
Grayenulla nova Zabka, 1992 – Australia (Western Australia)
Grayenulla spinimana Zabka & Gray, 2002 – Australia (Western Australia)
Grayenulla waldockae Zabka, 1992 – Australia (Western Australia)
Grayenulla wilganea Zabka & Gray, 2002 – Australia (New South Wales)
Grayenulla wishartorum Zabka, 1992 – Australia (Queensland)

References

Salticidae genera
Salticidae
Spiders of Australia